Frederick North, Lord North was appointed to lead the government of the Kingdom of Great Britain by King George III from 1770 to 1782. His ministry oversaw the Falklands Crisis of 1770, the 1780 Gordon Riots and the outbreak of the American War of Independence.

Ministers

Notes

References

External links
 

British ministries
Government
1770 establishments in Great Britain
1782 disestablishments in Great Britain
1770s in Great Britain
1780s in Great Britain
Ministries of George III of the United Kingdom